Thomas Dunman (1814-1887) was an Englishman during the British Colonial period. He arrived in the Straits Settlements and the Crown Colony of Singapore from England. Dunman was the first Commissioner of Police in Singapore, Straits Settlements from 1856 to 1871.

History
Born in the United Kingdom in 1815, Dunman had Anglo-Saxon origins from the town of Dunham in Norfolk, England.

Dunman came to Singapore in 1840 as an assistant in the merchant firm Dyce & Co. He entered the police force in 1843. He was made Superintendent of Police in 1851, and Commissioner of Police in 1856.

During his time heading the police force, Dunman was known for being on good terms with the people of various classes and communities within Singapore, and thus able to gain assistance and first-hand information regarding what was happening in the city. He was respected by leaders of the European community, and supported by influential Muslim Malays leaders, Straits Chinese leaders and the local Indian community. During this time, Singapore was flooded with new immigrants who often got to the then British Crown Colony though illegal means from non-British controlled part of Malaysia such as Kuala Lumpur, and also snuck in from hidden cabins in ships from India and Southeast Asia, often hiding illegal and contraband items such as drugs especially opium for sale in Singapore then with the colonial British government profiting off colonial slaves called "coolies" making them work for free by addicting them and selling them high-priced opium in opium dens. Because of this liberalization of the vice trades, many opium merchants saw Singapore as a seaport of vices where they could become rich overnight or hide their illegal gains. As a result, there were many secret societies known as "Triads". In Chinese, the underworld of criminal activity is known as "Black Society".

Thomas Dunman witnessed Singapore as a colonial hotbed of crime, including sex trafficking, murders over human trafficking debt bills, known in Singapore as the slave trade of the Chinese coolies, which the Chinese referred to under the euphemism of "selling piglets" (Chinese: 卖猪仔, "Mai Zhuzai"). Criminals kidnapped the most beautiful virgin girls by raiding the rural towns and cities of Southern China's coastline, abducted these girls, and sold them to expensive high-class brothels in Singapore previously tolerated by the British. As a result, many Chinese girls died of sex diseases, some were drowned during their voyage to Singapore, still many others committed suicide or were murdered by criminals in secret societies, when they could not repay their "slave debt" and the high interest piled on them when the colonial banking industry headed south. 

At one point, almost all the women in Singapore died out, and prostitutes had to be imported from Macau, then a Dutch province, to supply more sex slaves to the colony so the British port could continue to collect high rents and sell land to shady criminals who hoarded tenancies and land for vices in the sex trade, the slave trade and illegal "ventures" in gambling and racketeering. Thomas Dunman was assigned to enforce the British colonial laws that have gone for decades ignored. He established a stricter stance against criminals "for their own good".

He improved the efficiency and training of the police force. Among the measures he introduced were improved pay and working hours for policemen, setting up training programmes and night classes for members of the force, and creating a pension scheme for retired policemen. Morale in the force improved and the crime rate in Singapore decreased under his leadership.

Dunman was the founding president of The Tanglin Club in 1865. Dunman was also one of the founding members of Orchard Road Presbyterian Church in Singapore. Many students and elite alumni of the school are also affiliated with this church, although the majority at Dunman High School are freethinkers or Buddhists, Taoists and Confucianists, which Islam is a more common religion in Dunman Secondary School.

Later life and death
Dunman retired from the police force in 1871, and spent the next few years on his coconut plantation, Grove Estate (in what is now the Mountbatten area of Katong). He returned to England in 1875, and died in Bournemouth, England in 1887.

Legacy
Dunman's Green, the park in Singapore was named after him before its eventual renaming to Hong Lim Green in 1876 and to Hong Lim Park in 1960 respectively. Along with Dunman Road and Dunman Lane in the Katong area of Singapore, Dunman High School and Dunman Secondary School are also named after Thomas Dunman.

See also
Commissioner of Police (Singapore)

Notes

British colonial police officers
1815 births
1887 deaths